Porellaceae is a family of liverworts in the order Porellales.  It which originally created with just two genera, Ascidiota, and Porella.

It now has up to 8 genera;
 Antoiria  (1)
 Ascidiota   (3)
 Bellincinia  
 Macvicaria   (1)
 Opeca   
 Pandulfia  
 Porella   (265)
 Suaresia  

Figures in brackets how many species per genus

Bellincinia, Opeca, Pandulfia and Suaresia have yet to be confirmed as true genera.

References

External links 

Porellales
Liverwort families